Κατά τον δαίμονα εαυτού (transliterated: Katá ton Daímona Eautoú) is the eleventh full-length album by Greek extreme metal band Rotting Christ. The album title represents in Greek the well-known Aleister Crowley saying "Do what thou wilt".

Overview
The album incorporates diverse instrumentation, including bagpipes and horns, and delves into Incan, Persian, Babylonian, Mayan, Romanian, Slavic, and Greek mythology. Rotting Christ frontman Sakis Tolis considered the album "a journey into the knowledge of ancient civilizations and into the occultism that is rising from the dark side of each one of them". However, Tolis said: "A deep dig into the occult knowledge of the past led me to create this album. I have no special message. I was tired of them. I just want you to make your escape from everyday life and trip with me into the past".

Title
The Greek phrase "Κατά τον δαίμονα εαυτού" may be translated in several ways, including as "do what thou wilt", a quote associated with Aleister Crowley and Thelema. Sakis Tolis contended that this was the label's translation of the Greek phrase, and a more accurate translation is "true to your own spirit", which better fits the subject matter of the album.

The same sentence can also be seen on Jim Morrison's tombstone, again in Greek.

Track listing

 χξϛʹ is how the number 666 is written in Greek numerals;
 Русалка title is transliterated as "Rusalka";
 A sample from the 2000 film Gladiator (the German Leader's line) is used during the beginning of Welcome to Hel.

Personnel
 Rotting Christ
 Sakis Tolis – guitars, vocals, bass, keyboards
 Themis Tolis – drums, percussion

Additional personnel
 Georgis Nikas – bagpipes
 Babis Alexandropoulos, Alexandros Loutriotis, Theodoros Aivaliotis, Giannis Stamatakis, Androniki Skoula – choirs
 Eleni Vougioukli – piano (on track 5), vocals (on track 9)
 Suzana Vougioukli – vocals (on tracks 5 and 9)
 George Emmanuel – lead guitar (on track 7)

Miscellaneous staff
 Adrien Bousson – artwork, layout
 Nurgeslag – cover art
 George Emmanuel – engineering
 Jens Bogren – mixing, mastering
 Sakis Tolis – producer, mixing, mastering

References

Rotting Christ albums
2013 albums
Season of Mist albums